Akum is a Plateau language of Cameroon and across the border in Nigeria.

Phonology

Consonants 

Many consonants also have palatalized and labialized variants, but due to a lack of documentation it's unknown whether or not these are phonemic. Only /r/, /b/, /g/, /m/, /n/, and /ŋ/ occur at the end of a syllable, and /ŋ/ only occurs in this position.

Vowels 

/ə/ and /ɛ/ may be allophones.

Tone 
Akum has three tones: high, mid, and low.

References

Yukubenic languages
Languages of Cameroon
Languages of Nigeria